Jefferson Township is an inactive township in Wayne County, in the U.S. state of Missouri.

Jefferson Township has the name of President Thomas Jefferson.

References

Townships in Missouri
Townships in Wayne County, Missouri